The list of ship decommissionings in 1970 includes a chronological list of ships decommissioned in 1970.


See also 

1970
 Ship decommissionings
Ship